Jessie Stephen, MBE (19 April 1893  12 June 1979) was a twentieth-century British suffragette, labour activist and local councillor. She grew up in Scotland and won a scholarship to train as a teacher. Family finances dictated otherwise, leading to her becoming a domestic worker at the age of 15. She became involved in national labour issues as a teenager, via organisations such as the Independent Labour Party and the Women's Social and Political Union. After moving to Lancashire and London she visited the United States and Canada, where she held meetings with the public including migrant English domestic workers.

Stephen later become more involved in formal political parties, being elected as a local councillor and standing as a candidate in general elections. After moving to Bristol she became the first woman president of Bristol Trades Council. She was appointed MBE in 1977 and her life is commemorated by a blue plaque in Bristol.

Biography 

Stephen is recorded in the Oxford Dictionary of National Biography as a "suffragette and labour activist", and has been described as "working-class".

Early life and family 

Some sources give Stephen's place of birth as Marylebone, London, others as Glasgow. The eldest of eleven children in a "knit ... family", her father was a tailor. She has been described as "virtually the only Scottish working-class Women's Social and Political Union (WSPU) member about whom anything is known". She attended Sunday schools separately linked to the church and to socialism, and was educated at North Kelvinside School. She won a scholarship to train as a pupil-teacher.

Her father's low and variable income meant that she could not afford to pursue her aspiration to become a teacher, and became a domestic worker at the age of 15. Her father was a founder member of the Independent Labour Party (ILP) when it was established in 1893. She described her mother as being "so quiet and the very opposite of dad".

Early career 

She was referred to as a "young activist in the Maryhill Branch of the ILP", before she joined the WSPU in 1909, aged 16. In around 1911-12, as noted in her unpublished autobiography Submission is for Slaves (held at the Working Class Movement Library in Manchester), she formed the Scottish Federation of Domestic Workers. She organised her fellow maids  through meetings firstly in the streets and later in Alston's Tea Rooms in Bothwell Street, Glagow. The organisation eventually merged with the London-based Domestic Workers' Union of Great Britain and Ireland in 1913.

Stephen was the youngest member of the WSPU Glasgow delegation to the Chancellor of the Exchequer David Lloyd George in 1912, and, she led the first of the "Scottish Outrages", involving attacks on pillar boxes, in Glasgow in February 1913. Her job as a maid worked in her favour during these attacks, as she explained in a 1975 interview:"I was able to drop acid into the postal pillar boxes without being suspected, because I walked down from where I was employed in my cap, muslin apron and black frock... nobody would ever suspect me of dropping acid through the box."Stephen was approached by Sylvia Pankhurst and moved from Glasgow to London, where she became considered one of the "most active members" (along with Emma Boyce, around 1916) of the Workers' Suffrage Federation. In April 1919, Stephen was one of a number of speakers to address a crowd of "about 10,000 people" in Trafalgar Square, opposing the Blockade of Germany. Other speakers included Emmeline Pethick-Lawrence and Theodora Wilson Wilson. She was also an active member of the Women's Peace Crusade and at the 1920 ILP conference argued against the use of force during events preceding the Treaty on the Creation of the USSR.

In the 1920s she visited the United States, holding public meetings with immigrant communities from Scotland and Wales. and fund-raising for the Socialist Party of America. She also visited Vancouver, where she encouraged migrant English domestic workers to unionise.

Middle years 

Stephen later lived in Lancashire and also in London, where she became involved in the East London Federation and sold the Women's Dreadnought. She was elected Labour borough councillor for Bermondsey in 1922, after failing to be selected as a parliamentary candidate for the ILP, and worked for Bermondsey MP Alfred Salter. She stood as Labour candidate for Portsmouth South in the general elections of 1923, 1924 and 1929, and for Kidderminster in 1931.

From 1924 she worked as a freelance journalist, established a secretarial agency in Lewes in 1935 and joined the National Union of Clerks in 1938. At the time of the Second World War, she worked for Murphy Radio in Welwyn Garden City.
 
She later moved to Bedminster, Bristol, where she worked at the Broad Quay branch of the Co-operative Wholesale Society (CWS) and with the National Union of Clerks. She later became chair of the local CWS management committee. Around this time, she spoke publicly and gave advice on birth control. She was elected to the city council. In 1952 she became the first woman president of Bristol Trades Council.

Later life 

In the 1964 general election, she was a candidate for the Labour Party in the Weston-super-Mare constituency. She was appointed MBE for "services to the trade union movement" in June 1977.

She died at Bristol General Hospital in 1979, and her life is commemorated by a blue plaque in Bedminster.

References 

British women's rights activists
Members of Bermondsey Metropolitan Borough Council
Councillors in Bristol
1893 births
1979 deaths
Members of the Order of the British Empire
Labour Party (UK) councillors
Labour Party (UK) parliamentary candidates
Members of the Workers' Socialist Federation
Women's Social and Political Union
People associated with Glasgow
19th-century Scottish women
20th-century Scottish women
Scottish suffragettes
Scottish women in politics
British socialist feminists
Women councillors in England